The Petten High Flux Reactor (HFR) is a nuclear research reactor located in Petten, Netherlands. The HFR is on the premises of the Petten research centre and it is a high flux reactor. It is owned by the Joint Research Centre (JRC) and managed by the Nuclear Research and Consultancy Group (NRG).

Medical importance 

Apart from its function as a research centre, the HFR is a large producer of radioactive material for the purpose of medical diagnosis and the treatment of cancer (radiopharmaceuticals). The nuclear facility supplies 60% of the European demand for medical isotopes. Also at the high flux reactor, one of the neutron beam channels, which was originally installed for performing fundamental research, has been specially modified for the direct irradiation of patients. This allows use of neutrons for the treatment of tumors after saturation of these tumors with a pharmaceutical containing boron. When hit by a weak neutron beam, boron will locally emit radiation that will destroy the tumor. This technique is mainly suitable for the treatment of brain tumors.

Technology 

, only low-enriched uranium fuel was used at the facilities in Petten. As a result of political pressure from the United States and the International Atomic Energy Agency (IAEA), research reactors are no longer allowed to use highly enriched uranium fuel because of its potential use for the production of nuclear weapons. The use of highly enriched uranium targets for the production of medical isotopes was discontinued in January 2018.

The high flux reactor 

The high flux reactor in Petten has been in use since 1961. The first criticality was obtained on 9 November 1961. The reactor was furnished by Allis-Chalmers.

Its capacity was increased in steps to 45 MW (thermal) by 1970. The reactor is property of the European Commission and is operated by the Nuclear Research and Consultancy Group (NRG).

 the reactor is expected to remain operational until 2024, when it will be replaced at Petten by a new high flux reactor (PALLAS).

From August 2008, the reactor was shut down due to corrosion of the pipes in its primary cooling circuit. The operator brought the plant back on-line in February 2009.

The low flux reactor 

The low flux reactor was first used in 1960 and permanently shut down in 2010. It had a capacity of 30 kW. The reactor was property of the Nuclear Research and Consultancy Group (NRG) and mainly used for the production of neutrons for biological and physical research.

Timeline 

In 2009 the Argentine company INVAP (teamed with Spanish group Isolux) was pre selected in the international tender for the PALLAS project, for the procurement of an 80 MW nuclear reactor for the Dutch village of Petten, but in February 2010, the Dutch radiopharmaceutical producer Nuclear Research and Consultancy Group (NRG) extended the preparatory phase up to end of the year  for financing 

In mid-May 2014, NRG, the company that operates the reactor, asked for a bridging loan at the Dutch Ministry of Economic Affairs, because of the financial losses in the previous years. A bankruptcy could not be ruled out, if the credit would be refused. In addition, there were negotiations with the banks, because of the estimated 80 million euros, needed for the upcoming maintenance of the 50-year-old reactor.

See also 

 Chalk River Laboratories, a nuclear facility in Ontario that formerly produced North America's supply of isotopes for nuclear medicine

References

External links 

 
 Nuclear Research and consultancy Group
 Energy Research Centre of the Netherlands

Nuclear research reactors
Schagen
Nuclear technology in the Netherlands